Dyschromia refers to an alteration of the color of the skin or nails.

"Hyperchromia" can refer to hyperpigmentation, and "hypochromia" can refer to hypopigmentation.

"Dyschromatoses" involve both hyperpigmented and hypopigmented macules.


See also
Albinism
Albino and white squirrels
Amelanism
Chimera (genetics)
Coloboma
Erythrism
Heterochromia iridum
Leucism
Melanism
Piebaldism
Vitiligo
Xanthochromism

References

Cutaneous congenital anomalies
Disturbances of human pigmentation
Disturbances of pigmentation